Francis Duffy (born 21 April 1958) is an Irish Roman Catholic prelate who has served as Archbishop of Tuam since 2022.

Early life and education

Duffy was born in Bawnboy, County Cavan on 21 April 1958, the son of Frank Duffy and his wife Mary Catherine (née Dolan). He attended primary school at Munlough National School, Bawnboy, and secondary school at St Patrick's College, Cavan, before studying for the priesthood at St Patrick's College, Maynooth, completing a Bachelor of Philosophy and a Bachelor of Divinity.

Duffy was ordained a priest for the Diocese of Kilmore on 20 June 1982.

Presbyteral ministry 
Following ordination, Duffy completed a higher diploma in education, before receiving his first diocesan assignment, as a teacher at St Patrick's College, Cavan, where he taught history, religion and Irish between 1983 and 1994. He subsequently completed a Master of Arts in history from the National University of Ireland, Maynooth and Master of Education from Trinity College Dublin, before being appointed principal of Fatima and Felim's Secondary School, Ballinamore in 1996.

Duffy was appointed diocesan secretary, financial administrator and chancellor in 2008, as well as communications officer and archivist. He was subsequently appointed resident priest in Laragh the following year, during which time he also completed a doctorate in education.

Episcopal ministry

Bishop of Ardagh and Clonmacnoise 
Duffy was appointed Bishop-elect of Ardagh and Clonmacnoise by Pope Francis on 17 July 2013.

He was consecrated by the Archbishop of Armagh and Primate of All Ireland, Seán Brady, on 6 October in St Mary's Pro-Cathedral, Athlone.

Archbishop of Tuam 
Duffy was appointed Archbishop-elect of Tuam by Pope Francis on 10 November 2021.

He was installed on 9 January 2022 in the Cathedral of the Assumption of the Blessed Virgin Mary, Tuam.

References

External links

 Archbishop Francis Duffy on Catholic-Hierarchy.org
 Archbishop Francis Duffy on GCatholic
 Archbishop Francis Duffy on Archdiocese of Tuam

1958 births
Living people
Roman Catholic bishops of Ardagh and Clonmacnoise
Roman Catholic archbishops of Tuam
People from County Cavan
Alumni of Trinity College Dublin
Alumni of St Patrick's College, Maynooth
Alumni of the National University of Ireland
People educated at St Patrick's College, Cavan
21st-century Roman Catholic bishops in Ireland
21st-century Roman Catholic archbishops in Ireland